"Te Daría Mi Vida" is a song by Mexican singer Paulina Rubio, taken from her third studio album El Tiempo Es Oro (1995), written by C. Sánchez and C. Valle and produced by Miguel Blasco. The song was released as the album's lead single on 17 January 1995 by EMI Music. "Te Daría Mi Vida" is a dance-pop song and allegedly sold more than 140,000 copies in Mexico and the United States. The accompanying music video for the single was directed by Carlos Marcovich and was filmed in Xochimilco and the Estudios Churubusco in Mexico.

Composition
"Te Daría Mi Vida" is a dance-pop song that lasts for four minutes and 13 seconds.

Commercial performance
The single reached number six in the airplay charts of San Salvador. According to Rubio, "Te Daría Mi Vida" sold 140,000 copies in Mexico and the United States.

Music video
The accompanying music video for "Te Daría Mi Vida" was directed by Carlos Marcovich and was filmed in Xochimilco and in the Estudios Churubusco in Mexico, using 27 different scenarios. It was choreographed by Miguel Sahagún.

Track listing and formats
These are the formats and track listings of major single releases of "Te Daría Mi Vida".

 Mexico CD, Single, Promo 

 "Te Daría Mi vida" – 4:11

 Spain CD, Single, Promo 

 "Te Daría Mi vida" – 4:11

US CD Single, Remixes 
 "Te Daría Mi vida" (Album Version)" – 4:12
 "Te Daría Mi vida" (Big Mix)" – 6:26
 "Te Daría Mi vida" (Radio Mix)" – 4:30
 "Te Daría Mi vida" (Dub Mix) - 7:50

See also
 List of one-shot music videos

References

1995 singles
1995 songs
Paulina Rubio songs
Spanish-language songs
EMI Latin singles